Maxime Lubat (6 June 1914 - 1942) was a French wrestler. He competed in the men's Greco-Roman welterweight at the 1936 Summer Olympics.

References

External links
 

1914 births
1942 deaths
French male sport wrestlers
Olympic wrestlers of France
Wrestlers at the 1936 Summer Olympics
Place of birth missing
20th-century French people